Charles Henry Vintcent (2 September 1866 – 28 September 1943) was a South African cricketer who played in three Test matches from 1889 to 1892.

Born in Mossel Bay and educated in Cape Town and then Charterhouse School, England, Charlie Vintcent, was without doubt the most versatile South African sportsman of his time. He excelled in many sport he played representing both Western Province and Transvaal at rugby, obtaining his national colours for soccer, a sport he did much to promote on the Reef and as an athlete he was the Transvaal sprint champion in the events from the 100 yards to 440 yards for three years from 1889 to 1891, besides being competitive at both the long and high jump events. Charlie was a left-handed all-rounder who played in both tests in the first home series against England as well as the only test of the 1891/92 series against the second English touring side. He owed his original selection to his fine performance for Kimberley in the fifth match of the tour falling 13 runs short of a century and taking nine wickets in the match for one hundred and five runs off eighty nine overs. He was unable to carry this form into the Internationals and his Test record is not a true reflection of his ability. Nevertheless, he enjoyed a long career in provincial cricket which lasted some twenty seasons playing first an important role for Transvaal in the early Currie Cup fixtures, and then when he returned to the Southern Cape, he captained them in their only appearance at provincial level, by which stage he was close to forty years of age. Charlie Vintcent lived a long and active life, dying in 1943 at the age of seventy seven.

Family
He married Lilian Jackson and they had three children, among them Nevill Vintcent DFC, joint founder of the airline that went on to become Air India.

His elder brother, Joseph, won the FA Cup with Old Carthusians in 1881.

References

1866 births
1943 deaths
People from Mossel Bay
South Africa Test cricketers
South African cricketers
Gauteng cricketers
South African rugby union players
Golden Lions players
People educated at Charterhouse School